Archbishop O'Hara High School was a Catholic high school in Kansas City, Missouri. It was located in the Diocese of Kansas City-St. Joseph. The school was also associated with the De La Salle Christian Brothers, and was one of the ministries of the Midwest District of the Brothers.

Background
Archbishop O'Hara High School was established in 1965.  It was named after Archbishop Edwin Vincent O'Hara, former Bishop of the diocese of Kansas City-St. Joseph.

O'Hara was a college preparatory high school offering AP courses and university credit through Rockhurst University and the University of Missouri–Kansas City. 100% of its students attended post secondary education with approximately 75% enrolling in four year colleges and universities. O'Hara had great success in sports since its beginnings with state championships in a variety of sports. Sports offered included football, basketball, swimming, soccer, tennis, golf, wrestling, track, cross country.

History
The school was closed following the 2016–2017 school year. A new high school, St. Michael the Archangel High School, opened in Lee's Summit in 2017, and some of the faculty moved to the new school.  The building was listed on the National Register of Historic Places in 2021.

External links
  School Website

Notes and references

Roman Catholic Diocese of Kansas City–Saint Joseph
Defunct Catholic secondary schools in Missouri
High schools in Kansas City, Missouri
Catholic secondary schools in Missouri
Educational institutions established in 1965
1965 establishments in Missouri
National Register of Historic Places in Jackson County, Missouri